Cammy Hutchison (born 1 June 1998), is a Scottish Rugby Union player who plays for Edinburgh Rugby.  He usually plays inside centre but has also excelled at outside centre.

Rugby union career

Amateur career 
Hutchison is a former pupil of North Berwick High School and latterly George Heriot's School, Edinburgh. He entered the Scottish Rugby Academy in the 2015–2016 season as a stage 2 player.

He signed for Currie Rugby Club straight from school in 2016 and was recognised as the Young Player of the Year at the end of his first season.

Professional career 
Hutchison was awarded a Stage 3 contract in the BT Sport Scottish Rugby Academy in 2016.  

In 2018 Hutchison played in the south of France, through Scottish Rugby's performance partnership with French Federale 1 side Stade Niçois.

He returned to Scotland after his one-year loan period and signed for Heriot's Rugby in Scottish Rugby's Super 6 franchise earning 3 Player of the Match awards.

Hutchison started training with Edinburgh Rugby in November 2020 and made a try-scoring debut for the club in the Guinness PRO14 Rainbow Cup clash against Ulster in June 2021.

Following his performances in the Rainbow Cup Hutchison signed a professional contract with Edinburgh Rugby in partnership with FOSROC Super6 side Heriot's Rugby.

Following strong performances at the start of the 2021–2022 United Rugby Championship season, Hutchison's contract was upgraded a full time professional contract with Edinburgh Rugby.

International career 
Hutchison was chosen to lead the Scotland U18s at the inaugural International Series held in Wales in April 2016. He also Captained the Scotland U19s in a game against Georgia U20 in November 2016

Hutchison played in the highly successful Scotland U20 side in the 2016–2017 season before sustaining a season ending injury against England U-20's during a Six Nations game in Northampton.   He returned from injury in time to join the team for the 2017-18 World Cup in France.

References

External links
itsrugby.co.uk Profile
Cameron Hutchison awarded the FOSROC Player of the Match
Hutchison tests himself training with Edinburgh Rugby

 Edinburgh Rugby signs Cammy Hutchison

1998 births
Living people
Scottish rugby union players
Heriot's RC players
North Berwick RFC players
Rugby union centres
Currie RFC players
People educated at North Berwick High School
People educated at George Heriot's School
Stade Niçois players
Edinburgh Rugby players
Rugby union players from Birmingham, West Midlands